Lusso is a United Kingdom-based quarterly magazine dealing with all aspects of the luxury lifestyle market. It is published by SWR Media (Magazines) Ltd, an independent company based in London.  The first issue was published in January 2005.

Columns and blogs
Several well-known people have contributed to Lusso, including

Phil Spencer (Property)
Doug Richard (Yachts & Cars)
Andy Green (Super Cars, Motorbikes, Track Cars)
Simon Baron Cohen
Russ Malkin

References

External links

Lifestyle magazines published in the United Kingdom
Quarterly magazines published in the United Kingdom
Magazines established in 2005
Magazines published in London